Mecidiyeköy is a heavily built-up residential and business neighbourhood in the Şişli district of Istanbul, Turkey  squeezed in between the Fulya, Kuştepe, Gültepe, Esentepe, and Gülbahar neighbourhoods. In 2021 its estimated population was 23,760.

Mecideiyeköy means  "Mecid's Village" in Turkish, a name it acquired because  it was during the reign of the Ottoman sultan Abdülmecid I that it started to be settled.

Busy Halaskargazi Street runs through Şişli to Mecidiyeköy where it intersects with the D100 motorway. The Şişli-Mecidiyeköy Metro stop on the M2 line stops near this chaotic intersection, connecting the area with Taksim and Yenikapı. It also connects with the newer Mecidiyeköy station on the M7 Metro line to Mahmutbey. 

One exit from the Şişli-Mecidiyeköy Metro leads straight to the huge Cevahir shopping mall, which was, when it opened, the largest such mall in Europe.

Attractions 

Mecidiyeöy barely features on the sightseeing radar although there are a couple of things to attract the curious, most obviously the Abide-i Hürriyet (Liberty Monument) isolated amid the traffic chaos where Halaskargazi Street meets the D100 flyover. The monument commemorates the so-called 31 March incident when counter-revolutionaries attempted to overturn the new Young Turk government and return Sultan Abdülhamid II to the throne. Their effort failed and shortly afterwards the sultan was removed from office. Work on the monument was completed in 1911 and it went on to become a site for memorials to some highly controversial men including the Young Turks leaders, Enver Paşa and Talat Paşa. There is also a monument to Mithad Paşa, a reformist grand vizier who died in exile in what is now Saudi Arabia. The assassinated grand vizier Mahmud Sevked Paşa was actually buried here. 

Just to the south of the D100 flyway are three large cemeteries, one belonging to the Rum (Greek) Orthodox community, one to the Italian Jewish community and the third to the Armenian community. The Jewish cemetery is rarely open to outsiders. Buried in the Rum (Greek) Cemetery are the founders of the tiny and controversial Turkish Orthodox Church, Papas Eftim I, II and III.

Access
Mecidiyeköy is an important passenger transport hub on the European part of Istanbul.

Metrobus lines:
34 (Zincirlikuyu-Avcılar),
34A (Söğütlüçeşme-Cevizlibağ), 
34AS (Avcılar-Söğütlüçeşme), 
34BZ (Beylikdüzü Sondurak-Zincirlikuyu), 
34G (Söğütlüçeşme-TUYAP),
Metro line: M2 (Yenikapı-Hacıosman), M7 (Mecidiyeköy-Mahmutbey)
Bus lines: with terminus Mecidiyeköy only

The motorway  that forms the inner half ring road of Istanbul connecting European and Asian parts via the Bosphorus Bridge, runs through Mecidiyeköy on a viaduct.

See also
 Ali Sami Yen Stadium, demolished
 Istanbul Cevahir
 Profilo Shopping Center
 Trump Towers Istanbul
 Şişli

References

External links

 Miscellaneous images of Mecidiyeköy
 Mecidiyeköy Hotels Guide
 Mecidiyeköy Nakliyat
 Mecidiyeköy Metrosu

Neighbourhoods of Şişli
Transit centers in Istanbul